Watthana Nakhon is a district (amphoe) in the central part of Sa Kaeo province, eastern Thailand.

History
Watthana Nakhon is an ancient city. Established before 1917 and originally named Watthana, it was a minor district (king amphoe) in the Aranyaprathet district, until it was upgraded to a full district on 6 June 1956.

Geography
Neighboring districts are (from the east clockwise) Ta Phraya, Khok Sung, Aranyaprathet, Khlong Hat, Wang Nam Yen, Khao Chakan, Mueang Sa Kaeo of Sa Kaeo Province, Khon Buri, Soeng Sang of Nakhon Ratchasima province and Non Din Daeng of Buriram province. The Sankamphaeng Range mountainous area is in the northern section of this district.

Administration
The district is divided into 11 sub-districts (tambons), which are further subdivided into 115 villages (mubans). Watthana Nakhon is a sub-district municipality (thesaban tambon) and covers parts of tambon Watthana Nakhon. There are a further 11 tambon administrative organizations (TAO).

References

External links
amphoe.com (Thai)

Watthana Nakhon